Tylman may refer to:

Stanley D. Tylman (1893–1982), professor of dentistry (1920–1962), University of Illinois at Chicago College of Dentistry
Tylman van Gameren (1632–1706), Dutch-born Polish architect and engineer who settled in Poland and worked for Queen Maria Kazimiera